Erna Stein-Blumenthal was born on September 23, 1903, in Emden, Germany and worked as an art curator at the Jewish Museum in Berlin starting in May 1933. Blumenthal died on June 5, 1983, in Emek Chefer.

Education 
She had gone to the University of Breslau in Silesia and studied art history. She then got a doctorates for a dissertation in baroque columns.

Works 
Before she was an art curator, she had written articles for the General Lexicon of Fine Arts from Antiquity to the Present and had written a piece for the first volume of the Real Lexicon on German Art History which came out in 1937. In 1930 Blumenthal started working as an assistant of Karl Schwarz, who was creating a collection for the Berlin Jewish community by opening the Jewish Museum on January 24, 1933. Shortly after Adolf Hitler became Reich Chancellor, Schwarz received an offer to establish the Tel Aviv Museum of Art, so he assigned Blumenthal to run and direct the Jewish Museum in May 1933.

Exhibition 
Stein-Blumenthal's only recorded exhibition, Führer durch das jüdische Museum (Guide to the Jewish Museum), described relics, paintings, and sculptures made at the time.

Reference 

1903 births
1983 deaths
Women art historians
German art historians
German women historians
Women museum directors
German art critics
German curators
German women curators
Jewish emigrants from Nazi Germany
Israeli art historians
Israeli women historians
Israeli curators
Israeli women curators
University of Wrocław alumni
People from Emden
Jews and Judaism in Berlin